Odette is a French given name; Old German name Oda + diminutive -tte; a female form of Odo, Odet.

People named Odette include:
 Odette de Champdivers (c. 1390–c. 1425), chief mistress of King Charles VI of France
 Odette Annable (born 1985), American actress
 Odette Babandoa Etoa (born 1961), Congolese politician
 Odette Bancilhon (1908–1998), French astronomer
 Odette Barencey (1893–1981), French film actress
 Odette Barsa (1901–1975), American lingerie designer
 Odette Drand (1927–2019), French fencer
 Odette Dulac (1865–1939), French actress and singer
 Odette England (born 1975), Australian-British photographer
 Odette Le Fontenay (1885-1965), French opera singer, voice teacher
 Odette Gartenlaub (1922–2014), French pianist, music teacher and composer
 Odette Giuffrida (born 1994), Italian judoka
 Odette Hallowes (also known as Odette Sansom and Odette Churchill; 1912–1995), British spy
 Odette Herviaux (born 1948), French politician
 Odette Joyeux (1914–2000), French actress, playwright and novelist
 Odette Kahn (1923–1982), French wine critic
 Odette Krempin (1976–2016), Zairian fashion designer and socialite
 Odette Lapierre (born 1955), Canadian marathoner
 Odette Laure (1917–2004), French actress and singer
 Odette Lusien (1927–2007), French swimmer
 Odette Mistoul (born 1959), Gabonese shot putter
 Odette Monard (1903–?), French swimmer
 Odette Myrtil (1898–1978), French-born American actress and musician
 Odette Ntahonvukiye (born 1994), Burundian judoka
 Odette Nyiramilimo (born 1956), Rwandan physician and politician
 Odette Palma (born 1982), Chilean hammer thrower
 Odette Pavlova (born 1994), Russian fashion model
 Odette Piñeiro Caballero, Puerto Rican politician
 Odette Richard (1988–2020), South African rhythmic gymnast
 Odette Roy Fombrun (1917–2022), Haitian writer and intellectual
 Odette Siko, French auto racing driver
 Odette Tchernine, writer
 Odette Teissier du Cros (1906-1997), French ethnologist, curator
 Odette Valery (1883–?), Italian dancer
 Odette Vidal de Oliveira (1930–1939), Brazilian child saint

English feminine given names
French feminine given names